Bernadette Collins is a strategy engineer from Northern Ireland, who most recently worked for the Aston Martin Formula One team. She began her career as a trainee with McLaren after graduating from Queen's University Belfast in 2009. Three years later, Collins became a performance engineer and became its leader in that role full-time in 2014, working for 2009 World Champion Jenson Button. She joined Force India in 2015 and helped the team finish fourth in the following year's Constructors' Championship.

Collins was an ambassador for the United Kingdom government's Make it in Great Britain campaign in 2012, and featured on Forbes 2016 list of 30 Under 30 list for Manufacturing & Industry in Europe. She is currently a Sky Sports F1 presenter.

Biography

Early life and education
Collins was born in around 1985/1986. She is from the village of Maguiresbridge in County Fermanagh, Northern Ireland. Collins' father works in a garage but not as a mechanic. She described herself as a partial "tom-boy" because she built and dismantled farmyard machinery with her father. Although she did not intend to be employed within motor racing, Collins was undecided on her future career during a period of five years at Mount Lourdes Grammar School. Eventually, she chose to enrol on a mechanical engineering course at the Queen's University Belfast because of her like of mathematics and physics. Collins was one of three female students in a class of 30. Her interest in motor racing emerged in her final two years at university when she was part of the annual Formula Student programme that is organised by the Institution of Mechanical Engineers where universities design, test, construct, and drive small-scale formula style racing cars.

Career
Following the completion of Formula Student programme, but before she graduated in 2009, Collins applied for a graduate trainee programme with the McLaren Formula One racing team after seeing it advertised through Queen's University's Mechanical Engineering department. She was initially skeptical over securing the traineeship but she took advantage of an opportunity to visit the McLaren Technology Centre. Then, after completing a series of online assessments and tests, Collins secured a place on the programme in 2009. Her position entailed her rotating departments every three months to gain knowledge on each role and inter-team requirements. During her graduate year, Collins transferred into McLaren's design department and worked primarily on the transmissions of their vehicles. She also volunteered as an engineer at GP3 Series race weekends in order to broaden her experience.

Then, Collins received an offer to work part-time for the McLaren GT sports car racing team and undertook support for its factory operation to manage its greenhouse emissions, something she desired to work in. In 2012, she was promoted to the role of a performance engineer. That June, Collins was named as the United Kingdom government's Make it in Great Britain's 30 Under 30 list and she consequently became an ambassador for the campaign. She worked as a race engineer for the United Autosports GT team in 2013. When McLaren's primary performance engineer was absent on paternity leave in late 2013, Collins was temporary assigned to the position for the Indian and Abu Dhabi Grands Prix and was later handed the job full-time for the 2014 season. She worked with 2009 World Champion Jenson Button and the two had a good working relationship.

In May 2015, Collins left McLaren to join Force India as a performance and senior strategy engineer to driver Nico Hülkenberg as part of her objective of becoming an operations engineer. That season, she helped the team claim a podium with Sergio Pérez at the 2015 Russian Grand Prix and later got the team to fourth in the Constructors' Championship in 2016. That year, Collins was featured by Forbes in their 30 Under 30 list for Manufacturing & Industry in Europe.

In 2023, Collins joined Sky Sports for their F1 coverage.

References

People from County Fermanagh
Formula One engineers
Motorsport people from Northern Ireland
Alumni of Queen's University Belfast
21st-century women engineers
British women engineers
1980s births
Year of birth uncertain
Living people
Sky Sports presenters and reporters